See Chee How, is a Malaysian politician and lawyer who has served as Member of the Sarawak State Legislative Assembly (MLA) for Batu Lintang since April 2011. He is presently an independent. He was a member of the opposition Parti Sarawak Bersatu (PSB) and People's Justice Party (PKR), a component party of the Pakatan Harapan (PH) opposition coalition. He also served as State Vice Chairman of PKR of Sarawak before his sacking from the party.

Political career
Between August 2018 and February 2020, See served as special officer representing Minister of Works of Malaysia, Baru Bian, in Sarawak on a pro bono basis.

See was sacked from PKR in mid-April 2020 having been alleged to have supported the camp belonging to former party deputy president, Mohamed Azmin Ali, in the events leading up to the 2020 Malaysian constitutional crisis.

On 29 May 2020, president of United Sarawak Party (PSB), Wong Soon Koh, announced that See has been accepted as a member of PSB. See's addition to PSB comes as over 20 other former PKR members, either sacked or having resigned from the party, also received their acceptance into PSB.

On 14 August 2022, Speaker of the Sarawak State Legislative Assembly Mohamad Asfia Awang Nassar announced that See had informed him about leaving PSB two days prior on 12 August 2022 without adding reasons. This left PSB only three MLAs and the Opposition five in addition with another two from PH. His seating in the state assembly was also rearranged and moved away from the opposition seats.

Election results

See also
 Batu Lintang (state constituency)

References

Year of birth missing (living people)
Living people
People from Sarawak
People from Kuching
Malaysian politicians of Chinese descent
21st-century Malaysian lawyers
Malaysian politicians
Sarawak politicians
Members of the Sarawak State Legislative Assembly
Alumni of the University of London
21st-century Malaysian politicians
Former People's Justice Party (Malaysia) politicians